The Bernina Express is a train connecting Chur (or Davos) in Switzerland to Poschiavo in Switzerland and Tirano in Italy by crossing the Swiss Engadin Alps. For most of its journey, the train also runs along the World Heritage Site known as the Rhaetian Railway in the Albula / Bernina Landscapes.

The train is operated by the Rhaetian Railway company for the purpose of sightseeing. It takes the form of an enhanced regional service between Tirano and Chur or Davos: panoramic coaches with enlarged windows and multi-lingual (English, Italian and German) audio guide on board. It is not an "express" in the sense of being a high-speed train; passengers must make a seat reservation either directly when they purchase Bernina Express tickets, or pay a small supplement on top of their regional train tickets. The Bernina Express is popular with tourists and connects in Tirano with the Post Bus service via Lake Como in Italy to Lugano in Switzerland.

The Albula line and the Bernina line on the Bernina Express's route were jointly declared a World Heritage Site in 2008. The trip on the Bernina Express through this World Heritage Site is a four-hour railway journey across 196 bridges, through 55 tunnels and across the Bernina Pass at 2,253 metres above sea.

The Albula line was constructed between 1898 and 1904; it has been operated by the Rhaetian Railway since its inauguration. The Bernina line was built between 1908 and 1910 and operated independently until the 1940s, when it was acquired by the Rhaetian Railway. The Bernina Express uses gradients of 7% to negotiate the difference in height of about 1800 meters from the summit at Ospizio Bernina to Tirano.

Itinerary

Albula line 

The train leaves the city of Chur (585 m) in Graubünden and follows the course of the Rhine to Bonaduz (655 m). From there it enters the Domleschg Valley and follows the Posterior Rhine from Rhäzüns (658 m) to Thusis (697 m). The train continues toward Tiefencastel (851 m) following the Albula and then crosses the Landwasser Viaduct before arriving at Filisur (1032 m). Shortly after Filisur the train passes its first spiral tunnel and continues to Bergün/Bravuogn. Between Bergün/Bravuogn (1373 m) and Preda (1789 m), at the end of the valley, the train has to achieve a difference in height of about 400 meters with an horizontal distance of 5 km without using rack-and-pinion, but with many spirals. Then the train enters the Albula Tunnel at 1,815 m under the Albula Pass. It emerges in the Val Bever, where it reaches Bever (1,708 m) on the Engadin plain. The train continues toward Samedan (1,721 m) and arrives at the Pontresina station (1,774 m) in the Val Bernina (Bernina Valley).

Bernina line 

The train leaves Pontresina and ascends progressively through the valley to the Bernina Pass over the Morteratsch station (1,896 m), where the glacier and the highest summit of the Eastern Alps, Piz Bernina (4,093 m) are visible. Before arriving at the Bernina Pass, the train stops at Bernina Diavolezza (2,093 m) for cable-car connections to Diavolezza (2,921 m). The Bernina Express reaches the summit at the Ospizio Bernina station at 2,253 meters above Lago Bianco.

Alp Grüm (2,091 m) is the first station south of the Alps, situated above Lago Palü and right below Piz Palü (3,900+ m) and its glacier. After many hairpin turns the train reaches Cavaglia (1,693 m) above the Val Poschiavo, then the Swiss Italian-speaking town of Poschiavo (1,014 meters). The train then follows the course of the Poschiavino and stops at Le Prese (964 m) and Miralago (965 m), both on Lake Poschiavo's shore. After Miralago it continues its descent toward Brusio (780 m), where it passes the spiral Brusio Viaduct. Shortly after the Italian border at Campocologno (553 m), the Bernina Express ends its journey at Tirano station (430 m).

Route
During the summer, the Bernina Express comprises a special separate train that travels from Chur to Pontresina with very few stops. In Pontresina, the locomotive is changed (because of the Bernina line's different electricity current) and the train continues with few stops to Tirano.

During autumn, winter and spring, the Bernina Express comprises several cars that are attached to regional services. From Chur to Samedan, they are part of a RegioExpress train Chur – St. Moritz; from Samedan to Pontresina, they are part of a Regio train Scuol-Tarasp – Pontresina; from Pontresina to Tirano, they are part of a Regio train from St. Moritz – Tirano. Each of these Bernina Express trains includes designated carriages for passengers with only regional train tickets.

See also

 Albula Railway
 Bernina Railway
 Glacier Express
 Rhaetian Railway ABe 4/4 III
 Rhaetian Railway
 Swiss Alps
 Table of turn tunnels

References

External links

 Official website
 Switzerland Tourism Bernina Express

Transport in the Alps
Named passenger trains of Switzerland
Mountain railways
Tourist attractions in Switzerland
World Heritage Sites in Switzerland
World Heritage Sites in Italy
Rhaetian Railway